The 2007 Columbus Destroyers season is the 9th season for the franchise and the 4th in Columbus. They finished with a 7–9 record and qualified for the playoffs.  The Destroyers defeated the Tampa Bay Storm 56–55 in the first round.  The Destroyers advanced to the National Conference Championship by beating Dallas 66–59 in Dallas the following week. Columbus swept the table with the top three National Conference teams by defeating the Georgia Force 66–56 to win the National Conference Championship Game and their first conference title in team history and will go to New Orleans to participate in their first ever ArenaBowl XXI.

Coaching
Doug Kay started his second season as head coach of the Destroyers.

Season schedule

Playoff schedule

2007 roster

Stats

Offense

Quarterback

Running backs

Wide receivers

Touchdowns

Defense

Special teams

Kick return

Kicking

Playoff Stats

Offense

Quarterback

Running backs

Wide receivers

Special teams

Kick return

Kicking

Regular season

Week 1: at Nashville Kats

Scoring Summary:

1st Quarter:

2nd Quarter:

3rd Quarter:

4th Quarter:

Week 2: at New Orleans VooDoo

Scoring Summary:

1st Quarter:

2nd Quarter:

3rd Quarter:

4th Quarter:

Week 4: vs Chicago Rush

Scoring Summary:

1st Quarter:

2nd Quarter:

3rd Quarter:

4th Quarter:

Week 5: vs Georgia Force

Scoring Summary:

1st Quarter:

2nd Quarter:

3rd Quarter:

4th Quarter:

Week 6: at Dallas Desperados

Scoring Summary:

1st Quarter:

2nd Quarter:

3rd Quarter:

4th Quarter:

Week 7: vs Austin Wranglers

Scoring Summary:

1st Quarter:

2nd Quarter:

3rd Quarter:

4th Quarter:

Week 8: vs Philadelphia Soul

Scoring Summary:

1st Quarter:

2nd Quarter:

3rd Quarter:

4th Quarter:

Week 9: at Tampa Bay Storm

Scoring Summary:

1st Quarter:

2nd Quarter:

3rd Quarter:

4th Quarter:

Week 10: vs New York Dragons

Scoring Summary:

1st Quarter:

2nd Quarter:

3rd Quarter:

4th Quarter:

Week 11: vs Grand Rapids Rampage

Scoring Summary:

1st Quarter:

2nd Quarter:

3rd Quarter:

4th Quarter:

Week 12: at Colorado Crush

Scoring Summary:

1st Quarter:

2nd Quarter:

3rd Quarter:

4th Quarter:

Week 13: vs Dallas Desperados

Scoring Summary:

1st Quarter:

2nd Quarter:

3rd Quarter:

4th Quarter:

Week 14: at Georgia Force

Scoring Summary:

1st Quarter:

2nd Quarter:

3rd Quarter:

4th Quarter:

Week 15: vs Kansas City Brigade

Scoring Summary:

1st Quarter:

2nd Quarter:

3rd Quarter:

4th Quarter:

Week 16: at Philadelphia Soul

Scoring Summary:

1st Quarter:

2nd Quarter:

3rd Quarter:

4th Quarter:

Week 17: at New York Dragons

Scoring Summary:

1st Quarter:

2nd Quarter:

3rd Quarter:

4th Quarter:

Playoffs

Week 1: at Tampa Bay Storm

at the St. Pete Times Forum, Tampa, Florida

The Destroyers entered the playoffs for the first time since their move to Columbus. In a game that was back-and-forth scoring, the key play was a missed extra point by Storm kicker Seth Marler with 1:06 left in the game. Following a delay-of-game penalty, Marler missed an extra point attempt that, had he made it, would have given the Storm a 56–49 lead. After Columbus got the ball on the ensuing kickoff, they drove down to the Storm 1-yard line with 10 seconds left. Columbus QB Matt Nagy called his own number and sneaked into the Storm endzone with 7.9 left in the game, and, after the extra point attempt, the Destroyers had a 56–55 lead and looked to pull off the upset. With 3 seconds left and at their own 10-yard line, Marler tried to make amends by attempting a field goal that, if good, would give the Storm a 58–56 win and a game against division rival Georgia. Marler's kick looked good to begin with, but curved off to the left and missed, giving Columbus the upset win and a matchup against the 15–1 Dallas Desperados.

Scoring Summary:

1st Quarter:
1:41 TB- Terrill Shaw 9 Yard Pass From Brett Dietz (Seth Marler Kick) – 7–0 TB
4:10 CLB- Damien Groce 29 Yard Pass From Matt Nagy (Peter Martinez Kick) – 7–7
9:14 TB- Terrill Shaw 9 Yard Pass From Brett Dietz (Seth Marler Kick) – 14–7 TB
10:52 CLB- Harold Wells 11 Yard Pass From Matt Nagy (Peter Martinez Kick) – 14–14

2nd Quarter:
1:40 CLB- B.J. Barre 50 Yard Interception Return (Peter Martinez Kick) – 21–14 CLB
6:11 TB- Brett Dietz 2 Yard Run (Seth Marler Kick) – 21–21
10:53 CLB- Marcus Knight 23 Yard Pass From Matt Nagy (Peter Martinez Kick) 28–21 CLB
12:43 TB- Lawrence Samuels 18 Yard Pass From Brett Dietz (Seth Marler Kick) – 28–28
14:34 CLB- B.J. Barre 2 Yard Run (Peter Martinez Kick) – 35–28 CLB
14:41 TB- Terrill Shaw 2 Yard Pass From Brett Dietz (Seth Marler Kick) 35–35

3rd Quarter:
11:15 TB- Torrance Marshall 1 Yard Run (Seth Marler Kick) – 42–35 TB
13:04 CLB- Damien Groce 30 Yard Pass From Matt Nagy (Peter Martinez Kick) – 42–42

4th Quarter:
3:42 TB- Terrill Shaw 8 Yard Pass From Brett Dietz (Seth Marler Kick) – 49–42 TB
7:47 CLB- David Saunders 3 Yard Pass From Matt Nagy (Peter Martinez Kick) – 49–49
13:09 TB- Hank Edwards 17 Yard Pass From Brett Dietz (Pat Failed) – 55–49 TB
14:53 CLB- Matt Nagy 1 Yard Run (Peter Martinez Kick) – 56–55 CLB

Attendance: 10,221

Offensive player of the game: Terrill Shaw (TB)
Defensive player of the game: B.J. Barre (CLB)
Ironman of the game: Lawrence Samuels (TB)

Week 2: at Dallas Desperados

at the American Airlines Center in Dallas, Texas

The Destroyers blew a 30-point lead and lost to the Desperados earlier this season 53–51 and they lost the 2nd game in Columbus 56–47. This time, it looked as if Dallas, after a shaky start, would continue their dominance over the Destroyers. Leading 38–28 at the half, the tide turned on back-to-back kickoffs by Columbus kicker Peter Martinez. Dallas, who had deferred, got the opening kickoff. However, the ball bounced off the goalpost and into the hands of Columbus' Josh Bush, who rolled into the endzone to make it 38–35. On the very next kickoff, a nearly identical play occurred when the ball again bounced off the goalpost and Columbus recovered at the 4-yard line. On the next play, Damien Groce ran the ball in to give Columbus a sudden 42–38 lead 58 seconds into the second  half. After a Clint Dolezel interception set up a field goal for Columbus, Jason Shelley put the game away with a 28-yard reception with 12:55 left in the game to give Columbus a 2-touchdown lead that they held onto to pull off the upset against the Desperados.

Scoring Summary:

1st Quarter:

2nd Quarter:

3rd Quarter:

4th Quarter:

Attendance:

Week 3 (Conference Championship): at Georgia Force
at Philips Arena in Atlanta, Georgia

The Destroyers Pull off the Upset and they are going to ArenaBowl XXI In New Orleans to play the San Jose SaberCats.

Scoring Summary:

1st Quarter:

2nd Quarter:

3rd Quarter:

4th Quarter:

Attendance:

ArenaBowl XXI vs. San Jose SaberCats
at New Orleans Arena in New Orleans, Louisiana

Columbus Destroyers
Columbus Destroyers seasons
2007 in sports in Ohio